508-507-2209 is the fourth mixtape by American rapper Joyner Lucas. It was released on June 16, 2017, by Atlantic Records, making this his commercial debut. It was preceded by four singles: "I'm Sorry", "Ultrasound", "Just Like You" and "Winter Blues".

Background
The title is presumably taken from Lucas' phone number. The mixtape consists of sixteen songs. In an interview with HotNewHipHop about how the project came about, Joyner said:

"This project took two years in the making, there's a lot of records that I scrapped, start over, scrapped, start over. There's records that I've made from the very beginning two years ago that I still kept on the project now. So there's a lot of old mixed with new but it's all cohesive".

Singles
"I'm Sorry" was released as the lead single from the mixtape on August 5, 2016. The music video was released on August 12, 2016 and has received over 63 million views since its release. The song was produced by The Cratez.

"Ultrasound" was released as the second single on March 31, 2017, along with an accompanied music video. The music video has received over 9 million views since its release. The song was produced by Decap.

"Just Like You" was released as the third single on May 19, 2017, along with an accompanied music video. The music video has received over 23 million views since its release. The song was produced by Boi-1da and Dawaun Parker.

"Winter Blues" was released as the fourth single on June 2, 2017. The music video was released on October 23, 2017 and has received over 21 million views since its release. The song was produced by The Cratez.

Commercial performance
508-507-2209 debuted at number seven on the US Heatseekers Albums chart for the chart dated July 8, 2017.

Track listing
Credits were adapted from Tidal.

Notes
  signifies a co-producer
  signifies an additional producer
 "Ultrasound" features additional vocals from Shara Sood
 "Lovely" and "I'm Sorry" features additional vocals from Andrea Blanchard
 "Lullaby" features additional vocals from Boi-1da and Rosette Luve
 "One Lonely Night" features additional vocals from Ivy Rivera
 "FYM" was originally called "James Brown" but had to be re-titled to "FYM" for unknown reasons. 
Sample credits
 "Just Because" contains samples from "Jazzy Belle", written by André Benjamin, Antwan Patton, Patrick Brown, Raymon Murray and Rico Wade, as performed by OutKast
 "Way to Go" contains samples from "Falling Tears (Indian Drums)", written by Ernie Johnson and Edgar Campbell, as performed by Eddie & Ernie

Personnel
Credits adapted from Tidal.

Performers
 Joyner Lucas – primary artist
 Mystikal – featured artist 
 Snoh Aalegra – featured artist 
 Stefflon Don – featured artist 

Technical
 Nox Beatz – recording engineer , mixing engineer 

Instruments
 Alan Manos – horn 
 Dawaun Parker – organ 
 Nox Beatz – guitar , additional guitar 
 Andwele Coore – piano 

Production
 Decap – producer 
 Nox Beatz – producer , co-producer , additional producer 
 Boi-1da – producer 
 The Cratez – producer 
 Chill Shump – producer 
 Frank Dukes – producer 
 Dawaun Parker – producer 
 Statik Selektah – producer 
 Lord Quest – producer 
 Allen Ritter – producer 
 Joyner Lucas – producer 
 Nineteen85 – producer

Charts

References

External links
 Official site

2017 mixtape albums
Atlantic Records albums
Joyner Lucas albums
Albums produced by Boi-1da
Albums produced by Frank Dukes
Albums produced by Nineteen85
Albums produced by Statik Selektah
Albums produced by Allen Ritter